Joy of Living: A Tribute to Ewan MacColl is a compilation and tribute album to Ewan MacColl by various artists, released by Cooking Vinyl Records in the UK and Compass Records in the USA on September 18, 2015. The album was assembled and produced by MacColl's sons Calum and Neill.

References

2015 compilation albums
Compass Records albums
Tribute albums